A palacio de congresos (Spanish for "congress/conference palace") is a convention hall, often used as an event or exhibition space, and may refer to:

 Palacio de Congresos de Maspalomas, an indoor arena in Gran Canaria, Spain
 Palacio de Congresos railway station, in Seville, Spain
 Cadiz#Palacio de Congresos, in Cadiz, Spain
 Palacio de Congresos de Oviedo, a Santiago Calatrava building in Oviedo, Spain
 Palacio Municipal de Congresos de Madrid, in Madrid, Spain